The Vegetation Survey of Western Australia commenced as a project of the Department of Geography of the University of Western Australia  to provide vegetation maps for the state on the scales of 1:250,000 and 1:1,000,000.  There were some offshoot publications apart from the maps and notes.  The main author and worker of the project was John Stanley Beard, who was appointed a Member of the Order of Australia for the work in 2003.

The maps correlated broadly to the main regional names:
 Kimberley
 Great Sandy Desert
 Great Victoria Desert
 Nullarbor
 Pilbara
 Murchison
 Swan

See also
 Florabase
 IBRA
 The Western Australian Flora—A Descriptive Catalogue

References

.V
V
Vegetation of Australia
Field surveys
UWA Publishing books